Mirza Abolhassan Khan Shirazi Ilchi Kabir was an Iranian statesman who served as the Minister of Foreign Affairs from 1824 to 1834, and then again from 1838 until his death in 1846. He also served as the ambassador to Russia and the United Kingdom, and was the main Iranian delegate at the signing of the notorious Treaty of Gulistan (1813) with neighbouring Russia.

Family 
Abolhassan was born in 1776 at Shiraz; he was the second son of Mirza Mohammad-Ali, a secretary of Nader Shah, and a daughter of Ebrahim Khan Kalantar, thus making him part of the influential Qavam family of Jewish origins.

Exile and return 
As a young man, Mirza Abolhassan was appointed as the governor of Shushtar. In April 1801, however, the family lost much of its power and influence during the downfall of Ebrahim, and thus all members of the family were persecuted by the Iranian government. While many were blinded or killed, some managed to flee. Mirza Abolhassan, however, was captured by Iranian troops, and was exiled in his native Shiraz. Abolhassan shortly afterwards fled from Shiraz, reaching Basra, where he then took a vessel to Hyderabad in India. Luckily, he was some time later pardoned, and went back to Iran, where he served Fath-Ali Shah Qajar, and quickly rose to high offices.

Later life 
Abolhassan was chosen in 1809 as ambassador to lead a diplomatic mission to London at the court of the British king George III to seek support against growing ambitions of Russia in Caucasia. His escorting officer or "mehmandar" in the United Kingdom was Sir Gore Ouseley, who later encouraged Abolhassan to join the Freemasons which he did in 1810. During his trip, Abolhassan kept a diary that was later published under the title, Heyratnameth (the book of wonders). This book, in which Abolhassan formulated his perception of Europe's modern achievements, was read widely in the Qajar court and later inspired sociopolitical movements, such as Iran's constitutional revolution.

Upon his return of that mission, Mirza Abolhassan obtained the title "Khan" and "Ilchi" (envoy). Abolhassan was later appointed as the main delegate for Iran in the Gulistan of 1813 and Turkmenchay treaties, under which Iran lost most of her Caucasian territories to Russia. In 1835, Abolhassan sealed himself in the Shah-Abdol-Azim shrine as a protest to Prime Minister Ghaem Magham Farahani. Abolhassan Khan later died in 1845.

References

External links

1776 births
1846 deaths
People from Shiraz
Foreign ministers of Iran
18th-century Iranian politicians
19th-century Iranian politicians
Ambassadors of Iran to the Russian Empire
Ambassadors of Iran to the United Kingdom
People of the Russo-Persian Wars
Iranian people of Jewish descent
Iranian Freemasons
Qavam family